Eustace of Fauconberg was a medieval English Bishop of London from 1221 to 1228 and was also Lord High Treasurer.

Biography
Eustace was the son of Walter de Fauconberg of Rise-in-Holderness in the East Riding of the English county of Yorkshire.

Eustace was selected as treasurer in 1217, probably on 4 November, and held the office until his death. He held the prebend of Holbourn in the diocese of London before being elected to the see of London on 26 February 1221 and consecrated on 25 April 1221.

Eustace died between 24 and 31 October 1228. There was a tomb memorial to him in the quire at Old St Paul's Cathedral.

Citations

References
 
 

Fauconberg
Bishops of London
Lord High Treasurers of England
People from Holderness
1228 deaths
13th-century English Roman Catholic bishops
Year of birth unknown